Kim Nam-hui (born 4 March 1994) is a North Korean football defender who played for the North Korea women's national football team at the 2012 Summer Olympics. At the club level, she played for April 25.

International goals

See also
 North Korea at the 2012 Summer Olympics

References

External links
 
 

1994 births
Living people
North Korean women's footballers
People from Kimchaek
Footballers at the 2012 Summer Olympics
Olympic footballers of North Korea
Women's association football defenders
Asian Games medalists in football
Footballers at the 2014 Asian Games
North Korea women's international footballers
Asian Games gold medalists for North Korea
Footballers at the 2018 Asian Games
Medalists at the 2014 Asian Games
21st-century North Korean women